Sean Fraser (born 30 April 1990 in Edinburgh, Scotland) is a Scottish swimmer.

Fraser attended Lasswade High School. He won a bronze medal for Great Britain in the S8 100m backstroke at the Beijing Paralympics 2008, and a gold medal in the 2009 British Championships for the MC 100 m backstroke. He won bronze medals for the S8 50 m Freestyle, 400 m Freestyle and 100 m Backstroke events at the 2009 International Paralympic Committee (IPC) European Swimming Championships in Reykjavík, Iceland. At the 2010 Commonwealth Games in Delhi, India he won a silver medal in Men's 100 m freestyle S8 with a British record time of 1:00.77. He won a bronze medal for the 34pt 4 × 100 m freestyle relay at the 2011 IPC European Swimming Championships in Berlin, Germany. and a gold at the British Championships in 2012 for the MC 100 m freestyle.

Fraser swam for Warrender Baths Club in Edinburgh and Manchester HPC. He was inducted into the Scottish Swimming Hall of Fame in 2018.

References

1990 births
Living people
Sportspeople from Edinburgh
Scottish male swimmers
Swimmers at the 2008 Summer Paralympics
Swimmers at the 2012 Summer Paralympics
Swimmers at the 2010 Commonwealth Games
Commonwealth Games silver medallists for Scotland
People educated at Lasswade High School Centre
Paralympic swimmers of Great Britain
Medalists at the 2008 Summer Paralympics
Paralympic bronze medalists for Great Britain
Commonwealth Games medallists in swimming
Paralympic medalists in swimming
British male backstroke swimmers
British male freestyle swimmers
S8-classified Paralympic swimmers
Medalists at the World Para Swimming European Championships
Medallists at the 2010 Commonwealth Games